Oeschinen Lake (German: Oeschinensee) is a lake in the Bernese Oberland, Switzerland,  east of Kandersteg in the Oeschinen valley.

The lake was created by a giant landslide and is fed through a series of mountain creeks and drains underground. The water then resurfaces as the Oeschibach. Part of it is captured for electricity production and as water supply for Kandersteg.

The lake is generally frozen during five months, from December to May. From time to time ice skating is possible on the ice.

Fish in the lake include Arctic char (Seesaibling), lake trout (Kanadische Seeforelle), rainbow trout (Regenbogenforelle). From January to March, ice fishing is popular.

A gondola lift from Kandersteg leads to Oeschinen, 25 minutes by foot from the lake.

Since 2007 the lake is part of the Jungfrau-Aletsch-Bietschhorn UNESCO World Heritage Site.

As of summer 2021, a circumnavigation of Lake Oeschinen is not possible. The reason for this is the danger of an imminent rockfall on the south shore, which is why paths are closed there.

See also
List of lakes of Switzerland
List of mountain lakes of Switzerland

References

Fischerei im Oeschinensee

External links
Oeschinen Lake
Licht- und Wasserwerk AG
Kandersteg

Lakes of the Swiss Alps
Bernese Oberland
LOeschinensee
Tourist attractions in Switzerland
World Heritage Sites in Switzerland
Lakes of the canton of Bern